Sad Song of Yellow Skin is a 1970 direct cinema-style documentary, produced by the National Film Board of Canada, on the effects of the Vietnam War on street children in Saigon.

Production
Michael Rubbo had originally gone to Vietnam with the goal of making a documentary about the work of Foster Parents Plan with Vietnamese war orphans. Once there, when confronted with the enormity of what was taking place, he felt a film about this humanitarian operation was missing the real story. Rubbo's NFB producer, Tom Daly, supported him in his efforts to rethink the film.

Rubbo met the film's through Dick Hughes, a young American who offered his apartment as a safe haven for street kids. Hughes was part of a group of American student journalists who adopted a New Journalism approach to covering the war—a highly personal and involved approach that would influence Rubbo's style in making this film. This group of young journalists included John Steinbeck IV.  
   
Rubbo recorded his own subjective observations in a diary and developed the idea for what would be the first of his self-reflexive documentaries with the NFB. In Sad Song of Yellow Skin, Rubbo often comments on his own actions within the film, expressing his doubts, fears and concerns, reminding the viewer they are watching a film and not an objective representation of reality.

The film had a budget of $72,484.

Awards
 24th British Academy Film Awards, London: BAFTA Award for Best Documentary, 1971 
 Melbourne International Film Festival, Melbourne: Silver Boomerang, Best Film, 1971
 HEMISFILM, San Antonio TX: Best Film, 1971
 Festival of World Television, Los Angeles: Best Documentary, 1971
 American Film and Video Festival, New York: Blue Ribbon
 American Film and Video Festival, New York: Emily Award
 22nd Canadian Film Awards: Toronto: Special Award for Reportage, 1970
 Atlanta Film Festival: Gold Medal, Special Jury Award, 1971

References

Works cited

External links
Watch Sad Song Of Yellow Skin at the National Film Board of Canada

1970 films
1970 documentary films
Films directed by Michael Rubbo
National Film Board of Canada documentaries
Documentary films about the Vietnam War
Self-reflexive films
Canadian Screen Award-winning films
BAFTA winners (films)
Documentary films about street children
Films produced by Tom Daly
1970s Canadian films